Cornelia Clark Fort (February 5, 1919 – March 21, 1943) was a United States aviator who became famous for being part of two aviation-related events. The first occurred while conducting a civilian training flight at Pearl Harbor on December 7, 1941, when she was the first United States pilot to encounter the Japanese air fleet during the Attack on Pearl Harbor. She and her student narrowly escaped a mid-air collision with the Japanese aircraft and a strafing attack after making an emergency landing.

The following year, Fort became the second member of what was to become the Women Airforce Service Pilots or WASP. Fort was working as a WASP ferry pilot on 21 March 1943 when she became the first female pilot in American history to die on active duty. She was involved in a mid-air collision and crashed ten miles south of Merkel, Texas in Mulberry Canyon, Texas.

Early life
Fort was born to a wealthy and prominent family in Nashville, Tennessee; her father, Rufus Elijah Fort, was a founder of National Life and Accident Insurance Company. She received a high school certificate from the Ward-Belmont School in 1936. She graduated from Sarah Lawrence College in 1939. After college, Fort joined the Junior League of Nashville. She showed an early interest in flying, ultimately training for and earning her pilot's license in Nashville, TN. She was the second woman in Tennessee to get her commercial license and the first woman in Tennessee to get her instructors' license. She applied to many flying schools and was accepted as an instructor at a Colorado flight training school. While there, she was offered a position in Hawaii, which she accepted.

Flying career

Pearl Harbor attack

While working as a civilian pilot instructor at Pearl Harbor, Cornelia Fort inadvertently became one of the first witnesses to the Japanese Attack on Pearl Harbor that brought the United States into World War II. On December 7, 1941, Fort was in the air near Pearl Harbor teaching takeoffs and landings to a student pilot in an Interstate Cadet monoplane. Her airplane and a few other civilian aircraft were the only U.S. planes in the air near the harbor at that time. Fort saw a military airplane flying directly toward her and swiftly grabbed the controls from her student to pull up over the oncoming craft. It was then she saw the rising sun insignia on the wings. Within moments, she saw billows of black smoke coming from Pearl Harbor and bombers flying in. She quickly landed the plane at John Rodgers civilian airport near the mouth of Pearl Harbor. The pursuing Zero strafed her plane and the runway as she and her student ran for cover. The airport manager was killed and two other civilian planes did not return that morning.

Womans Auxiliary Ferry Squadron (WAFS)
With all civilian flights grounded in Hawaii, Fort returned to the mainland in early 1942. She made a short movie promoting war bonds that was successful and led to speaking engagements. Later that year, Nancy Love recruited her to serve in the newly established Women's Auxiliary Ferrying Squadron, precursor to the Women Airforce Service Pilots (WASP). She was the second woman accepted into the service. The WAFS ferried military planes to bases within the United States.

Death
Stationed at the 6th Ferrying Group base at Long Beach, California, Cornelia Fort became the first WAFS fatality. On March 21, 1943, while flying in formation en route from Long Beach to Love Field in Dallas, the left wing of her BT-13 was struck by the landing gear of flight officer Frank Stamme Jr.'s plane. Stamme had been flying too close to Fort's plane, approaching her and then pulling back. On one of the close passes, the collision took place, breaking off the tip of her wing and six feet of leading edge. He was able to control his plane, but Fort went into an irreversible dive and crashed. The accident occurred ten miles south of Merkel, Texas in Mulberry Canyon, Texas.  At the time of the accident, Cornelia Fort was one of the most accomplished pilots of the WASPs. The footstone of her grave is inscribed, "Killed in the Service of Her Country."

Legacy
Cornelia Fort was portrayed in the film Tora! Tora! Tora! by actress Jeff Donnell. The Cornelia Fort Airpark in East Nashville is named after her.

See also
Women Airforce Service Pilots (WASP)
Women Airforce Service Pilots Badge
United States Army Air Forces
Women's Army Corps (WAC)
United States Army Air Forces
United States Air Force

References

Further reading
Brinker Tanner, Doris. "Cornelia Fort: A WASP in World War II, Part I," Tennessee Historical Quarterly volume 40 (1981), pp. 381–94; "Cornelia Fort: Pioneer Woman Military Aviator, Part II," Tennessee Historical Quarterly volume 41 (1982), pp. 67–80.
Fort, Cornelia. "At the Twilight's Last Gleaming: Personal-Experience Narrative of a Member of the WAFS," in The Army Reader, ed. Karl Detzer, Bobbs-Merrill, 1943, pp. 313–16. Also in Woman's Home Companion, June 1943.
Regis, Margaret. When Our Mothers Went to War: An Illustrated History of Women in World War II. NavPublishing, 2008.

External links
PBS American Experience biography of Cornelia Fort
Collection of articles on Cornelia Fort
National Museum of the USAF, fact sheet on Cornelia Fort
Photos of the crash site

World War II Veteran's Survey for Cornelia Fort, Tennessee Virtual Archive.

1919 births
1943 deaths
United States Army Air Forces personnel killed in World War II
Aviators from Tennessee
Aviators killed in aviation accidents or incidents in the United States
People from Nashville, Tennessee
Sarah Lawrence College alumni
Women Airforce Service Pilots personnel
American women flight instructors
American flight instructors
Members of the Junior League
Victims of aviation accidents or incidents in 1943